Dmitry Andreyevich Landakov (born 21 May 1999) is a Russian football player who plays for FC Ural Yekaterinburg.

Club career
He made his debut in the Russian Premier League for FC Ural Yekaterinburg on 21 August 2021 in a game against FC Dynamo Moscow.

Career statistics

References

External links
 
 
 

1999 births
Footballers from Moscow
Living people
Russian footballers
Association football goalkeepers
FC Lokomotiv Moscow players
FC Orenburg players
FC Ural Yekaterinburg players
Russian Second League players
Russian Premier League players